The International Society for Third-Sector Research (ISTR), founded in 1992, is an international association that is dedicated to promoting research and education on civil society, philanthropy, and the nongovernmental sector. ISTR works to unite scholars and researchers to exchange ideas and advance knowledge on both a local and international scale, regarding the third sector, human welfare and international development.

Since its founding, ISTR has been housed at The Johns Hopkins University, most currently residing under the Bloomberg School of Public Health’s Institute for Health and Social Policy. According to their website, ISTR’s mission is “to increase, share, and apply knowledge about the Third Sector in all countries of the world” and to build a global community of scholars and researchers for the advancement of knowledge and discussions regarding the Third Sector, and its global impact.

ISTR holds biennial conferences as well as Regional Network meetings, allowing locally focused researchers to meet and discuss region-specific issues. Additionally, the organization is working to increase the number of third sector researchers from the developing world and East and Central Europe. Both the international and regionally held meetings, along with other ISTR-led endeavors, comprise a large part of achieving the organization’s vision.

Currently, ISTR has nearly 900 members from 76 countries globally. The organization has been recognized for its role in shaping development globally through the research of its members.

According to the organization Learning To Give, the main aim of the network has been to create a space for collaboration in order to understand and make use of the positive impact of the third sector. In this regard, “ISTR has almost single handedly changed the face of the third-sector around the globe.  Associations are no longer forced to operate on information islands with little communication exchange, since the ISTR has opened up a dialogue for scholars and practitioners who benefit from one another on an international basis”.

ISTR was admitted as an affiliate member of the American Council of Learned Societies in 1997. Aside from being a member of numerous civil society groups, ISTR is itself composed of a network of researchers, other civil society actors, and students.  Other research networks that collaborate with ISTR include the European Research Network on Philanthropy  (ERNOP), and the EMES International Research.

Leadership 
The ISTR leadership team is run by a 15-member board of directors that is “staffed by an Executive Director, Margery Daniels, and a Program Assistant”. Additionally, there are “three ex officio members, including the past president, the Editor of Voluntas, and the liaison to Johns Hopkins University, the host institution for ISTR”.

Regional networks
ISTR is composed of five regional networks. These include: Africa Regional Network, Asia Pacific Regional Network, European Regional Network, Latin American and the Caribbean Network, and Post Soviet Regional Network.

International conferences
Every two years ISTR holds a conference in a different country to bring together members to discuss new research in the third sector and promote. ISTR has had 12 of these international conferences with the most recent one being held in Stockholm, Sweden in 2016. A list of the locations of previous conferences is given below.
Pecs, Hungary 1994
Mexico City, Mexico 1996
Geneva, Switzerland 1998
Dublin, Ireland 2000
Cape Town, South Africa2002
Toronto, Canada 2004
Bangkok, Thailand 2006
Barcelona, Spain 2008
Istanbul, Turkey 2010
Siena, Italy 2012
Muenster, Germany 2014
Stockholm, Sweden 2016

The next international conference is set to take place in Amsterdam, Netherlands in July 2018.

ISTR also holds regional network meetings.
 
Africa Regional Network Conferences
2016 Accra, Ghana
2013 Nairobi, Kenya
2011 Stellenbosch, South Africa
 
Asia Pacific Regional Network Conferences
2015 Tokyo, Japan
2013 Seoul, Korea
2011 Bali Indonesia
2009 Taipei, Taiwan
2007 Manila, Philippines
2005 Bangalore, India
2003 Beijing, China
2001 Osaka, Japan
1999 Bangkok, Thailand
 
Latin America and the Caribbean Regional Network Conferences
2015 San Juan/Ponce, Puerto Rico
2013 Santiago, Chile
2011 Buenos Aires, Argentina
2009 Mexico City, Mexico
2007 Salvador de Bahia, Brazil
2005 Lima, Peru
2003 San Jose, Costa Rica
2001 Buenos Aires, Argentina
1999 Santiago, Chile
1997 Rio de Janeiro, Brazil
1996 Mexico City, Mexico

Publications
ISTR publishes an interdisciplinary research and policy journal, Voluntas, six times a year, offering a platform for scholarly theory, empirical studies, and critical commentary, and providing a central forum for international research in the third. The journal combines full-length articles with shorter research notes and book reviews.

Voluntas is published six times a year and has occasional thematic issues. Some thematic issues include Civil Society and Happiness: Japan and Beyond (Volume 26, Number 1 February 2015), Civil Society and Third Sector in Asia (Volume 26, Number 4 August 2015), Welfare Mix and Hybridity (Volume 26, Number 5 October 2015), Unlikely Partners? Evolving Government-Nonprofit Relationships, East and West (Lester M. Salamon Guest-Editor) (Volume 26, Number 6 December 2015), Latin America (Volume 27, Number 1 February 2016), and Citizenship in China (Volume 27, Number 5 October 2016).

References

Organizations based in Baltimore
Organizations established in 1992
International organizations based in the United States
Johns Hopkins University